Al-Rumaitha City is a city in Muthanna Governorate, Iraq. It is the capital of Al-Rumaitha District. Its population in 2014 was 115,431. The economy is predominantly agricultural, specializing in the production of date palms and grains.

Name
Al-Rumaitha is named after the saxaul plant, al-ramth in Arabic.  It has had other names in the past.
It was called al-'Auja (العوجة, crooked) due to the way the river distorts the shape of the city, and al-Abyad (الاأبيض, white) due to the supposed presence of the white lion in its environs.

History
The city contains 35 archaeological sites, pertaining to different time periods from the Babylonian to the Islamic eras.

During the British occupation of Iraq, the British used al-Rumaitha, at that time a small village, as a military camp to support the supply and transportation of British forces moving from Basra and Nasiriya to Baghdad. In 1920, the Iraqi revolt against the British began in al-Rumaitha on 30 June, after the British arrested Sheikh Shaalan Abu al-Jun of the al-Dhuwalim tribe. Members of his tribe mounted a raid on the government holding facility and freed him. The city also supported the anti-British 1941 Iraqi coup d'état and participated in the anti-British Al-Wathbah uprising of 1948. 

King Faisal I visited the city in 1922, as did Ghazi in 1937 and Faisal II in 1948, accompanied by 'Abd al-Ilah and Nuri al-Said.

Geography
Rumaitha is located beside one of the branches of the Euphrates River. It is approximately 25 kilometers north  of Samawah, and several roads link the two cities.

References

Districts of Muthanna Governorate